Toyota Motor Corporation's P family is a family of light/medium-duty transmissions found in Toyota cars. They use Porsche-type synchronizers.

P51
Ratios:
 First Gear: 3.525:1
 Second Gear: 2.054:1
 Third Gear: 1.396:1
 Fourth Gear: 1.00:1
 Fifth Gear: 0.859:1

Applications:
 1973-1981 Celica with 18R-G engine
 1974-1981 Carina with 18R-G engine
 1974-1981 Corona with 18R-G engine
 1974-1981 Mark II / Cressida with 18R-G engine

See also
List of Toyota transmissions
Toyota W transmission
Toyota T transmission

References

External links
Toyota Transmissions
Toyota Engines and Gearboxes

P
Year of introduction missing